Narciso "Bong" Recio Bravo Jr. is a Filipino politician, who represents the 1st congressional district of the province of Masbate. The district is composed of the municipalities of Batuan, Claveria, Monreal, San Fernando, San Jacinto and San Pascual. He was elected in 2013 as the new mayor of San Fernando, Masbate.

Personal life
Bong Bravo was born on January 15, 1964, in Cataingan, Masbate. His parents are Narciso G. Bravo, a former RTC judge, and Amparo Recio-Bravo, a teacher. He took up civil engineering at Aquinas University of Legazpi City and graduated in 1986 and passed the PRC licensure examination on the same year. He is married to Maria Vida Espinosa-Bravo who is the daughter of two former representatives (Tito R. Espinosa and Vida Versoza-Espinosa). They have 4 children.

Political career
Narciso "Bong" Bravo, Jr. is a native of the Province of Masbate in Bicol Region, Philippines. The inevitable course of his political career came in upon the assassination of his father-in-law, the late Rep. Tito R. Espinosa in 1995. He was elected as one of the Provincial Board Members in 1995 and finished the term in 2004. In 2004, upon completion of her mother-in-law, Rep. Vida Espinosa's term in Congress, he took over and completed the three-term stint in 2013. Thereafter, he was elected Municipal Mayor of San Fernando in Ticao Island from 2013 to 2016. He regained his congressional seat in 2019 for his 4th term, and while on this spot, he was also elected by the lower house as the Chair of the Committee on Public Order and Safety, which is one of the most powerful committees of the House of Representatives as this ensures safety and security of the nation, as a whole.

Congress
While serving in the lower chamber Bravo served different committee membership including the vice-chair of the powerful committee on appropriations. He is a member and the current Secretary General of the National Unity Party (NUP).

 July 30, 2019 - elected CHAIR of the Committee on Public Order and Safety, House of Representatives

 July 3, 2020 - Sponsored the enacted Republic Act 11479, otherwise known as "The Anti- Terrorism Act of 2020"

 Sponsored, co-authored RA 11549, otherwise known as "An Act Lowering the Minimum Height Requirement for the Applicants of the Philippine National Police (PNP), Bureau of Fire Protection (BFP), Bureau of Jail Management and Penology (BJMP), and Bureau of Corrections (BUCOR), was signed May 26, 2021

To date :
-- Two (2) Legislative measures enacted into law
-- acted on sixty five (65) House Bills
-- drafted nine (9) Substitute Bills
-- prepared ten (10) Committee Reports of which four (4) were filed

References

External links
Masbate Province Official Site
Masbate City Official Site
www.masbateonline.com
Committee on Appropriations

Living people
Mayors of places in Masbate
Members of the House of Representatives of the Philippines from Masbate
National Unity Party (Philippines) politicians
Filipino civil engineers
Lakas–CMD politicians
1964 births
People from Masbate